Hemibagrus lacustrinus is a species of bagrid catfish found in Sumatra, Indonesia in the Danau Singkarak and upper Ombilin River.

References

Bagridae
Fish of Asia
Fish of Indonesia
Taxa named by Heok Hee Ng
Taxa named by Maurice Kottelat
Fish described in 2013